The  Copa Governador do Estado da Bahia (previously Taça Estado da Bahia) was a tournament organized by Federação Baiana de Futebol in order to decide which club would represent  the state at the Copa do Brasil.

List of champions

Taça Estado da Bahia

Copa Governador do Estado da Bahia

Titles by team

Teams in bold stills active.

By city

References

Football in Bahia